Troy Perkins (born 3 November 1976) is an Australian former professional rugby league footballer who played for the St. George Dragons and the Penrith Panthers.

Perkins, who grew up in Sydney, attended Holy Cross College, Ryde and was an Australian Schoolboys representative player.

A forward, he started his career at Balmain and helped the Tigers to the 1994 Jersey Flegg premiership. Without making a first-grade appearance, he moved to St. George for the 1997 ARL season and made his premiership debut in the final round, which they drew 12-12 against Parramatta. He also played six premiership games for Penrith in the 1999 NRL season.

From 1999-00 to 2002-03 he played rugby league in France, for first three seasons at Toulouse and then one at UTC (now known as the Catalans Dragons).

Following his time in France, Perkins became a coach in England, where he remains based. He was a long serving coach of the Hemel Stags, leading the club for 12 seasons.

References

External links
Troy Perkins at Rugby League project

1976 births
Living people
Australian rugby league coaches
Australian rugby league players
Catalans Dragons players
Hemel Stags
St. George Dragons players
Penrith Panthers players
Rugby league props
Rugby league second-rows
Rugby league players from Sydney
Toulouse Olympique players